Junaphaenops tumidipennis is a species of beetle in the family Carabidae, the only species in the genus Junaphaenops.

References

Trechinae